Euryglottis guttiventris is a moth of the  family Sphingidae. It is known from Bolivia, Ecuador, Peru and Argentina.

There are distinct apical spots on sternites three to five and a pale basal patch. Furthermore, the discal band and vein-streaks on the forewing upperside are less distinct than in similar Euryglottis aper.

Adults are on wing in June and December.

References

Euryglottis
Moths described in 1903